Daniel Clive McCallum (born 1989 in Sydney, Australia) is a film composer, conductor, and orchestrator. He is a graduate of the Royal Academy of Music in London.

He is known for orchestrating and arranging the music for the 2016 Summer Olympics in Rio de Janeiro, Brazil, which won the Sports Emmy Award for best music direction.

McCallum is the son of Ron McCallum, a noted Australian legal academic.

Career

McCallum left traditional school at the age of 13 to study music at the Sydney Conservatorium of Music. There, he studied musical composition, oboe, conducting, as well as traditional Australian instruments with William Barton. He was awarded the ABRSM scholarship in 2008 to study composition at the Royal Academy of Music. After graduating, McCallum went on to work with Howard Shore on The Hobbit: An Unexpected Journey. McCallum is a prominent and awarded orchestrator. He orchestrated the 2016 Summer Olympics in Rio de Janeiro, Brazil. For this, the production won a Sports Emmy Award. In 2019, McCallum orchestrated the new anthem for La Liga. McCallum was nominated for a Grammy Award in 2020 as part of the String Theory Artist Collective for his work on the album Sekou Andrews & The String Theory.

McCallum has also been commissioned to write many contemporary classical pieces. Notably, his works have been performed by the BBC Singers, the Philharmonia Orchestra, the Omega Ensemble in the Sydney Opera House, the Penrith Symphony Orchestra, the Sydney Sinfionetta, the Sonic Arts Ensemble, the London Contemporary Orchestra, the Crossroads Chamber Festival (performed by Paul Silverthorne), the Choir & Organ magazine, Ars Musica Australis, the Warringah Council, the Chronology Arts Ensemble, and the Royal Academy of Music.

He currently resides in Los Angeles with his wife where he works as a composer.

Filmography

2012: The Hobbit: An Unexpected Journey (assistant orchestrator) 
2014: The Smoke (orchestrator) 
2015: The Mentors (composer) 
2015: Endless Night (orchestrator) 
2015: Palm Trees in the Snow (orchestrator)
2016: 2016 Summer Olympics theme in Rio de Janeiro, Brazil (orchestrator & arranger)
2016: No Panic, with a Hint of Hysteria (orchestrator) 
2016: Penumbra (composer) 
2016: Loving in Limbo (composer) 
2016: Realive (orchestrator) 
2017: Bruce!!!! (composer) 
2018: King of Knives (composer) 
2018: The Map to Paradise (composer) 
2018: The Tree of Blood 
2018: Alegria, Tristeza (orchestrator) 
2019: La Liga theme (orchestrator & arranger)
2019: Zero (orchestrator) 
2019: Farewell (composer) 
2020: The Crossroad (composer) 
2021: Wild Game (composer) 
2022: Vindication Swim (composer) 
2022: Dance Dads (composer) 
2023: Cottonmouth (composer)

Awards & Nominations

Won:
Sports Emmy Award, 2017 
Best Original Score, LA Crime and Horror Film Festival, 2019 
Best Original Score, Independent Shorts Awards, 2019 
Best Music, Top Indie Film Awards, 2019 

Nominations:
Grammy Award, 2020 for Sekou Andrews & The String Theory

Discography

The Map to Paradise (Original Motion Picture Soundtrack) 
Bruce!!!! (Original Motion Picture Soundtrack) 
Loving in Limbo (Original Motion Picture Soundtrack) 
Retrospective, Vol. 1 
Dance Dads (Original Motion Picture Soundtrack)

References

External links
 

Alumni of the Royal Academy of Music
Living people
American film score composers
American male film score composers
American multi-instrumentalists
American television composers
20th-century classical composers
1989 births
20th-century American male musicians